Selišče is a small settlement on the left bank of the Sušica River in the Municipality of Dolenjske Toplice in Slovenia. The area is part of the historical region of Lower Carniola. The municipality is now included in the Southeast Slovenia Statistical Region.

References

External links
Selišče on Geopedia

Populated places in the Municipality of Dolenjske Toplice